Mendell is a surname. Notable people with the surname include:

David Mendell, American journalist
Estelle Mendell Amory, American educator and author
Gary Mendell, American businessman
Harry Mendell, American inventor
Joshua T. Mendell, American researcher
Lorne Mendell, American neurobiologist

See also
Mendel (name)